Les Pétroleuses may refer to:

 The Women Incendiaries, a 1963 history book about the Paris Commune
 The Legend of Frenchie King, a 1971 film